The collared mongoose (Urva semitorquata) is a mongoose species native to Borneo and Sumatra; its presence in the Philippines is uncertain. It is listed as Near Threatened on the IUCN Red List.

Taxonomy
Herpestes semitorquatus was the scientific name proposed by John Edward Gray in 1846 for a dark brown mongoose specimen collected in Borneo.
Mungos semitorquatus uniformis proposed by Herbert C. Robinson and Cecil Boden Kloss in 1919 were two collared mongooses collected in Ophir District, West Sumatra. All Asian mongooses are now thought to belong in the genus Urva.

Bornean and Sumatran collared mongooses exhibit little genetic divergence.

References

Urva (genus)
Mammals of Brunei
Mammals of Indonesia
Carnivorans of Malaysia
Mammals of Borneo
Mammals described in 1846
Taxa named by John Edward Gray
Taxonomy articles created by Polbot
Taxobox binomials not recognized by IUCN